Joseph Guo Jincai (born February 1968) is a Chinese Roman Catholic Bishop of Roman Catholic Diocese of Hebei, China. He is also vice-president of Chinese Patriotic Catholic Association and China Committee on Religion and Peace.  He was a deputy to the 13th National People's Congress.

Biography
Guo was born in Chengde, Hebei, in February 1968. He became the Roman Catholic Bishop of Chengde in 2010 and was ordained bishop by Bishop of Tangshan Fang Jianping that year. Guo Jincai has been made a bishop of Chengde in Hebei without consent of the pope and was excommunicated latae sententiae. On December 9, 2010, he was elected vice-president of Chinese Patriotic Catholic Association.

On September 22, 2018, Pope Francis lifted the excommunication of Joseph Guo Jincai and other six bishops previously appointed by the Chinese government without a pontifical mandate.

References

1968 births
People from Chengde
Living people
21st-century Roman Catholic bishops in China
People temporarily excommunicated by the Catholic Church
Bishops of the Catholic Patriotic Association